The Castlemaine Diggings National Heritage Park is near the town of Castlemaine, Victoria, Australia.The park protects a nationally significant historic cultural landscape of heritage value and relics of the Victorian gold rush.

The Castlemaine Diggings National Heritage Park was added to the Victorian Heritage Register in December 2003.  It is the largest non-indigenous protected cultural landscape in Australia.  In January 2005 the park was added to the Australian National Heritage List recognizing its outstanding heritage value and importance in the course of Australia’s migration history.

See also 

 Garfield water wheel

References

Victorian Heritage Register
Parks in Victoria (Australia)
Australian National Heritage List
Cultural landscapes of Australia